Protoazin is an extinct genus of early hoatzin from late Eocene (about 36 mya) deposits of France.

References

Opisthocomiformes
Cenozoic birds of Europe
Fossil taxa described in 2014
Birds described in 2014